General Cemetery may refer to:

Cemeteries
Sheffield General Cemetery, UK
Boroondara General Cemetery, Australia
Ipswich General Cemetery, UK
Hull General Cemetery, UK
Melbourne General Cemetery, Australia

Other
General Cemetery (Cementerio General in Spanish) a Peruvian supernatural horror film directed by Dorian Fernandez Moris.